Gujuli-Ondona is a town council in the municipality of Urkabustaiz, Álava province, Basque Country, Spain. It comprises the villages of Gujuli (Basque: Guiuri) and Ondona. There is a waterfall near Gujuli named for the village, the Cascada de Gujuli. 

Towns in Álava